Ronald "Ron"/"Ronnie" James (5 February 1938) is a Welsh former rugby union, and professional rugby league footballer who played in the 1950s, 1960s and 1970s.

Playing career

International honours
Ron James represented Other Nationalities (RL) while at Halifax, he played  in the 2-19 defeat by St. Helens at Knowsley Road, St. Helens on Wednesday 27 January 1965, to mark the switching-on of new floodlights. and represented Commonwealth XIII (RL) while at Halifax in the 7-15 defeat by New Zealand at Crystal Palace National Recreation Centre, London on Wednesday 18 August 1965.

Championship final appearances
Ron James played in Halifax's 15–7 victory over St. Helens in the 1964–65 Championship Final during the 1964–65 season at Station Road, Swinton on Saturday 22 May 1965.

County Cup Final appearances
Ron James played , and scored 2-goals in Halifax's 10-0 victory over the Featherstone Rovers in the 1963–64 Yorkshire County Cup Final during the 1963–64 season at Belle Vue, Wakefield on Saturday 2 November 1963.

Career Records
Ron James holds Halifax's "Most Career Points" record with 2191 points, and is one of less than ten Welshmen to have scored more than 2000-points in their rugby league career.

Testimonial match
Ron James' Testimonial match at Halifax took place in 1971.

Honoured at Halifax RLFC
Ron James is a Halifax RLFC Hall Of Fame Inductee.

References

External links
Statistics at rugbyleagueproject.org

1938 births
Living people
Halifax R.L.F.C. players
Maesteg RFC players
Other Nationalities rugby league team players
Place of birth missing (living people)
Rugby league fullbacks
Rugby league players from Neath Port Talbot
Rugby union fullbacks
Rugby union players from Neath Port Talbot
Welsh rugby league players
Welsh rugby union players